Bask-e Kuleseh Rural District is in the Central District of Sardasht County, West Azerbaijan province, Iran. At the National Census of 2006, its population was 6,212 in 1,119 households. There were 5,040 inhabitants in 1,130 households at the following census of 2011. At the most recent census of 2016, the population of the rural district was 4,233 in 1,027 households. The largest of its 42 villages was Kulseh-ye Sofla, with 714 people.

References 

Sardasht County

Rural Districts of West Azerbaijan Province

Populated places in West Azerbaijan Province

Populated places in Sardasht County